Ronaldo Meosido (born 30 June 1992, in Manokwari) is an Indonesian professional footballer who plays as a midfielder.

Club career

Perseru Serui
Ronaldo made his debut when against Mitra Kukar in First week 2016 Indonesia Soccer Championship A. His first goal when he scored against Persiba Balikpapan, at that time, he scored from a free kick.

Persipura Jayapura
He was signed for Persipura Jayapura to play in Liga 1 in the 2019 season. Meosido made his debut on 18 May 2019 in a match against Persib Bandung at the Si Jalak Harupat Stadium, Soreang.

Sriwijaya
In 2021, Meosido signed a contract with Indonesian Liga 2 club Sriwijaya. He made his league debut on 21 October against KS Tiga Naga at the Gelora Sriwijaya Stadium, Palembang.

References

External links
 Ronaldo Meosido at Soccerway
 Ronaldo Meosido at Liga Indonesia

1992 births
Living people
Indonesian footballers
Liga 1 (Indonesia) players
Perseru Serui players
People from Manokwari
Association football midfielders